Charles Dunsmore Millard (December 1, 1873 – December 11, 1944) was a Republican member of the United States House of Representatives from New York.

Biography
Millard was born in Tarrytown, New York. He attended Phillips Academy, Brown University, and New York University School of Law. He was Supervisor of the Town of Greenburgh (a member of the Board of Supervisors of Westchester County) from 1907 to 1931. He was elected to Congress in 1930 and represented New York's 25th congressional district from March 4, 1931, until his resignation on September 29, 1937, to serve as surrogate of Westchester County. He retired in 1943.

He committed suicide on December 11, 1944, by jumping from the Henry Hudson Bridge in New York City.

Sources

Town supervisors in New York (state)
New York (state) state court judges
1873 births
1944 deaths
New York Law School alumni
Burials at Sleepy Hollow Cemetery
American politicians who committed suicide
Suicides by jumping in New York City
Republican Party members of the United States House of Representatives from New York (state)
Brown University alumni